Vyachaslaw Holik (born 1 May 1989) is a Belarusian former professional footballer.

In July 2020 Holik was found guilty of being involved in a match-fixing schema in Belarusian football. He was sentenced to 1 year of house arrest and banned from Belarusian football for three years.

References

External links

1989 births
Living people
Belarusian footballers
Association football defenders
FC Naftan Novopolotsk players
FC Savit Mogilev players
FC Slavia Mozyr players
FC Granit Mikashevichi players
FC Rechitsa-2014 players
FC Khimik Svetlogorsk players
People from Mogilev
Sportspeople from Mogilev Region